William Keith Weigand (born May 23, 1937) is an American prelate of the Roman Catholic Church.  He served as bishop of the Diocese of Sacramento in California from 1993 to 2008. Weigand previously served as the bishop of the Diocese of Salt Lake City in Utah and as a priest in the Diocese of Boise in Idaho.

Biography

Early life 
Weigand was born on May 23, 1937, in Bend, Oregon, one of four sons of Harold and Alice Weigand. When Weigand was age 12, the family moved to St. Maries, Idaho.  He attended St. Maries Academy in Cottonwood, Idaho, a school run by the Benedictine Sisters. In 1951, Weigand entered Mt. Angel Minor Seminary in Saint Benedict, Oregon, for secondary school and two years of college.

In 1959, Weigand graduated from St. Edward Seminary in Kenmore, Washington, with a Bachelor of Arts in philosophy. He then attended St. Thomas Seminary in Denver, finishing in 1963 with a Master of Divinity degree.

Priesthood 
On May 25, 1963, Weigand was ordained to the priesthood for the Diocese of Boise by Bishop Sylvester W. Treinen at St. Mary Immaculate Church in St. Maries. His first assignment was at Our Lady of Lourdes Parish in Lewiston, Idaho.  However, in 1964, Treinen asked Weigand to serve as vice chancellor of the diocese in Boise.  In 1965, Weigand was named chancellor.

Weigand served as a parochial vicar in several parishes in the diocese, and as the administrator of several missions. Weigand served from 1964 to 1968 as the chancellor and vice-officialis of the diocese, and was a member of the diocesan council of presbyters.

In 1968, Weigand moved to Cali, Colombia, to work at a mission run by the Diocese of Boise. In an interview after his retirement, Weigand described his work in Colombia:“We had a huge challenge to provide religious instruction for youth, to prepare people for Confirmation and marriage. We also established social service ministries that included medical clinics and food pantries. So we had to develop networks of lots of people to help. All these ministries were satellite communities, of sorts, under the umbrella of the parish. It was almost the exact image of a diocese.”  While in Colombia, Weigand started experiencing health issues and requested a return to the United States.  In 1978, he was appointed pastor of St. Hubert's Parish in Homedale, Idaho.

Bishop of Salt Lake City 
On September 3, 1980, Pope John Paul II appointed Weigand as bishop of the Diocese of Salt Lake City. He was consecrated on November 17, 1980,by Archbishop John R. Quinn, Bishop Sylvester Treinen and Bishop Joseph Federal at the Salt Palace Convention Center in Salt Lake City. 

Soon after becoming bishop, Weigand was diagnosed with primary sclerosing cholangitis, the source of his health issues. However, he was able to continue as bishop. In 1990, Weigand created one of the strongest sexual abuse policies then in effect in the United States.

Weigand led a $9.7 million restoration of the Cathedral of the Madeleine in Salt Lake City from 1991 to 1993. Aside from repairing and cleaning the cathedral, the restoration aimed at bringing it into compliance with liturgical changes resulting from the Second Vatican Council.  The most important change was moving the altar closer to the congregation.

Bishop of Sacramento
On November 18, 1993, Pope John Paul II appointed Weigand as bishop of the Diocese of Sacramento. He was installed January 27, 1994, at the Cathedral of the Blessed Sacrament in Sacramento.

In 1996, Weigand celebrated the funeral mass of former Governor Pat Brown. Then Governor Pete Wilson, previous Governor Jerry Brown, and Sacramento Mayor Joe Serna, Jr. also spoke at the funeral mass. In 2005, as a result of Weigand's primary sclerosing cholangitis, he experienced liver failure.  In April 2005, he received a liver transplant. In October 2007, Father Jaime Soto was named as coadjutor bishop to assist Weigand.

Retirement 
In 2008, Weigand submitted a letter of resignation to Pope Benedict XVI due to health issues.  It was granted on November 29, 2008, and on November 30, 2008, Soto succeeded Weigand as bishop of the Diocese of Sacramento.

See also
 

 Catholic Church hierarchy
 Catholic Church in the United States
 Historical list of the Catholic bishops of the United States
 List of Catholic bishops of the United States
 Lists of patriarchs, archbishops, and bishops

References

External links

 Roman Catholic Diocese of Sacramento official website

Episcopal succession

Roman Catholic bishops of Sacramento
Roman Catholic bishops of Salt Lake City
20th-century Roman Catholic bishops in the United States
21st-century Roman Catholic bishops in the United States
Roman Catholic Diocese of Boise
People from Bend, Oregon
1937 births
Living people
Mount Angel Seminary
Catholics from Oregon